Tuveh may refer to:
 Tuveh, Khuzestan
 Tuveh, West Azerbaijan

See also
 Tuveh Khoshkeh (disambiguation)